The Maroon V Tour  (also known as M5 On the Road Tour) was the tenth headlining concert tour by American band Maroon 5 in support of their fifth studio album V (2014) (pronounced: "five"). The tour began on February 16, 2015, in Dallas and concluded on May 12, 2018 in Zapopan, Mexico, comprising 136 concerts.

Background and development 
The tour was announced in May 2014. The band stated that, through a contract with Live Nation, they are set to embark on a world tour in late 2014 through to early 2015 in support of the new album. In June, the band posted a photo on their official Instagram account asking fans where they should perform "with a tour coming soon".
Also through Instagram, in August the band revealed with a series of photos the states where they will bring the tour.
All the dates for North America and Europe were announced on September 2, 2014 and due to the high demand, second shows as well as brand new dates were later announced by the band.
During 2015, Maroon 5 announced shows in Asia, Oceania, Mexico and South America, as well as a second leg in North America which is scheduled to take place in cities where they have not performed during the first.
In early 2016, new European shows were added. In September 2016, Maroon 5 confirmed the seven dates of the North American leg from September and October 2016, was postponed until February and March 2017.

Opening acts

2015 
 Magic! (North America and Europe)
 Rozzi Crane (North America)
 Nick Jonas (North America)
 Matt McAndrew (North America)
 Phases (North America)
 We Are I.V (Europe)
 Nick Gardner (Europe)
 Mike Watson (Europe)
 Ghita (Africa)
 Dirty Loops (Asia and Oceania)
 Conrad Sewell (Australia)

2016 
 Rey Pila (Mexico)
 The Mills (Colombia)
 Foxley (Argentina)
 Dashboard Confessional (Brazil)
 Dingo Bells (Brazil)
 Elle King (North America)
 Tove Lo (North America)
 Phases (North America)
 R. City (North America)
 PJ Morton (North America)
 Polly A (North America)

2017 
 R. City (North America)
 Tinashe (North America)
 The Roots (North America)
 The Revivalists (North America)
 Incubus (Peru)

2018 
 De La Rut (Guatemala)

Setlist 
This set list is representative of the show in Kansas City on March 21, 2015. It is not representative of all concerts for the duration of the tour.
 "Animals"
 "One More Night"  
 "Stereo Hearts" 
 "Harder to Breathe"
 "Lucky Strike"
 "Wake Up Call"
 "Love Somebody"
 "Maps"
 "This Love"
 "Sunday Morning"
 "Makes Me Wonder"
 "Payphone"
 "Daylight"
 "It Was Always You"
 "She Will Be Loved"
 "Moves Like Jagger"
 "Sugar"
 "This Summer" (recorded music video on May 28)

Shows

Cancelled shows

References

Notes

Citations 

2015 concert tours
2016 concert tours
2017 concert tours
2018 concert tours
Maroon 5 concert tours
Concert tours of North America
Concert tours of the United States
Concert tours of South America
Concert tours of Asia
Concert tours of Canada
Concert tours of Europe